Ballettratten is a 1925 German silent drama film directed by Arthur Günsburg and starring Carl de Vogt, Cläre Lotto, and Victor Varconi.

The term Ballettratte is based on the French .

Cast

References

External links

1925 films
Films of the Weimar Republic
German silent feature films
Films directed by Arthur Günsburg
Films about ballet
German drama films
1925 drama films
German black-and-white films
Silent drama films
1920s German films
1920s German-language films